Nebari may refer to:
 In bonsai aesthetics, the surface roots flaring from the base of a tree
 The fictional Nebari alien race from the Farscape universe